Oncidium lineoligerum is a species of orchid occurring from Costa Rica to northern Peru.

References

lineoligerum